The Cruiser is a novel of war at sea by Warren Tute. It follows the story of HMS Antigone, a fictional British  of the Second World War named after the mythical Greek character Antigone. The novel paints a realistic picture of life on a cruiser in the late 1930s and early war years: the principal character is the ship herself, with many members of her crew (from the captain to the "three fat men of the sea") as supporting actors.

Published in 1955, The Cruiser ran to three editions in a matter of weeks.

HMS Antigone is not to be confused with HMS Antigone of the Nathaniel Drinkwater series by Richard Woodman.

References

 Ottawa Citizen review
 Historic Naval Fiction

Novels set during World War II
1955 British novels
Leander-class cruisers (1931)
English novels
Novels set on ships
Cassell (publisher) books